Yearby is a village in the borough of Redcar and Cleveland and the ceremonial county of North Yorkshire, England. It is located half a mile south of Kirkleatham on the B1269 road to Guisborough, close to Marske-by-the-Sea. Today, it consists of sixty-nine addresses and four hundred and twenty residents.

Due to its location at the bottom of Yearby bank it is prone to flooding. This most recent and worst case of this happened back in 2012 when water levels reached a height of 0.55m. There were no casualties or injuries caused despite it flooding several homes and gardens. 

Plans to develop the village have begun with the installation of a solar farm towards the end of the village near kirkletham.

History
Historically the village has been a part of the Kirkleatham civil parish. The name has changed through the centuries from Overby or Ureby in the 15th century to Earby and Verby in the 17th century. For much of its history, the lands comprising Yearby have followed the path of Kirkleatham, except between 1119 and 1635. After this date, it formed part of the Kirkleatham Estate owned by the Turner family until it was broken up in 1949. Until 1840, the village had a school. This is now a private dwelling, though a Grade II listed building.

Governance
The village is within the Redcar Parliamentary constituency and the Dormanstown ward of Redcar and Cleveland Borough Council.

References

External links

Redcar and Cleveland
Places in the Tees Valley
Villages in North Yorkshire